Tom Clougherty is a British academic who has been the Head of Tax at the Centre for Policy Studies since April 2018. He was previously the editorial director of the Center for Monetary and Financial Alternatives at the Cato Institute. He was also managing editor of the Cato Journal. Clougherty previously served as executive director of the Adam Smith Institute, a free-market think tank based in London. Clougherty holds a B.A. in law from the University of Cambridge. 

Clougherty has appeared regularly on the television network CNBC to discuss economic issues relevant to the United Kingdom.

Clougherty has also been research director at the Globalisation Institute, and is a senior fellow at The Cobden Centre, an Austrian economics think-tank.  Before joining Cato in February 2015, Clougherty was managing editor at Reason Foundation.

References

Living people
English libertarians
Austrian School economists
Year of birth missing (living people)